Cavendish University Zambia (CUZ) is a private university located in Lusaka, Zambia. It is affiliated to Cavendish International Limited, London.

Cavendish University Zambia was opened in 2004 and was the first private university to operate in Zambia. The university is registered with the Higher Education Authority which is a grant aided institution established under the Higher Education Act No. 4 of 2013.  Cavendish is also affiliated to Association of African Universities (AAU).

Campuses 
Cavendish University Main Campus - Villa Elizabeth, Lusaka
Cavendish University Long acres Campus - Long acres, Lusaka

Schools 
Cavendish University Zambia offers various accredited programmes in four schools.
School of Medicine
School of Law
School of Business and Information Technology
School of Arts, Education and Social Sciences

References

External links 
Cavendish  University Zambia Official Website

Universities in Zambia
Education in Lusaka
Educational institutions established in 2004
2004 establishments in Zambia